|}

The Flying Fillies' Stakes is a Listed flat horse race in Great Britain open to fillies and mares aged three years or older. It is run at Pontefract over a distance of 6 furlongs (1,027 metres).

The race was first run in 1998, and it is scheduled to take place each year in August.

Records

Most successful horse:
 no horse has won this race more than once

Leading jockey (2 wins):
 Tony Culhane - Cotton House (2002), Goldeva (2004)
 Graham Lee - Artistic Jewel (2013), Castle Hill Cassie (2018)
 Silvestre de Sousa - Divine (2015), Perfection (2019)

Leading trainer (2 wins):
 Mick Channon - Cotton House (2002), Divine (2015)
 Richard Fahey – Rose Blossom (2011), Queen Kindly (2017)
 Chris Wall -  Bounty Box (2010), Double or Bubble (2021)

Winners

See also
 Horse racing in Great Britain
 List of British flat horse races

References
 Racing Post:

Flat races in Great Britain
Pontefract Racecourse
Sprint category horse races for fillies and mares
Recurring sporting events established in 1998
1998 establishments in England